Microstomus shuntovi is a flatfish of the family Pleuronectidae. Its native habitat is the north Pacific.

References

Microstomus
Fish of the Pacific Ocean
Fish described in 1983